Parsimony refers to the quality of economy or frugality in the use of resources.

Parsimony may also refer to

 The Law of Parsimony, or Occam's razor, a problem-solving principle
 Maximum parsimony (phylogenetics), an optimality criterion in phylogenetics
 Parsimony Press, a fine press brand ran by typographer Robert Norton

See also 
 Frugality
 Philosophical razor
 Simplicity